Meredith McGrath and Nathalie Tauziat were the defending champions but only McGrath competed that year with Manon Bollegraf.

Bollegraf and McGrath won in the final 6–4, 6–4 against Rennae Stubbs and Helena Suková.

Seeds
Champion seeds are indicated in bold text while text in italics indicates the round in which those seeds were eliminated.

 Manon Bollegraf /  Meredith McGrath (champions)
 Rennae Stubbs /  Helena Suková (final)
 Els Callens /  Laurence Courtois (semifinals)
 Alexandra Fusai /  Karin Kschwendt (first round)

Draw

External links
 1996 EA-Generali Ladies Linz Doubles Draw

1996 WTA Tour